This list deals with association football rivalries around the Europe among clubs. This includes local derbies as well as matches between teams further afield. For rivalries between international teams and club rivalries around the world, see List of association football rivalries.

Only clubs of federations which are members of UEFA are included.

International
 Barcelona-Chelsea rivalry: FC Barcelona vs. Chelsea FC
 Barcelona-Man United rivalry: FC Barcelona vs. Manchester United 
 Barcelona-Inter rivalry: FC Barcelona vs. Inter Milan
 Barcelona-PSG rivalry: FC Barcelona vs. Paris Saint-Germain
 Man-City-Bayern rivalry: Manchester City vs. Bayern Munich
 Bayern-Real Madrid rivalry: Bayern Munich vs. Real Madrid
 Juventus-Real Madrid rivalry: Juventus FC vs. Real Madrid
 Man United-Juventus rivalry: Manchester United vs. Juventus FC
 Real Madrid-Dortmund rivalry: Real Madrid vs. Borussia Dortmund
 Leeds vs. Galatasaray rivalry: Leeds United vs. Galatasaray S.K.
 Man United-Bayern rivalry: Manchester United vs. Bayern Munich
 Yugoslav Big Four derbies:
 Red Star Belgrade vs. Dinamo Zagreb
 Red Star Belgrade vs. Hajduk Split
 Partizan Belgrade vs. Dinamo Zagreb
 Partizan Belgrade vs. Hajduk Split
 Spartak Moscow-Dynamo Kyiv rivalry: Spartak Moscow vs. Dynamo Kyiv
Shamrock vs. Linfield rivalry: Shamrock Rovers vs. Linfield F.C.
Śląsk-Sevilla rivalry: Śląsk Wrocław vs. Sevilla F.C.
 Federal derby: Slovan Bratislava vs. Sparta Praha
Slovan-Ferencváros rivalry: Slovan Bratislava vs.Ferencvárosi TC
Malmö-Copenhagen (Öresund) rivalry: Malmö FF vs. FC Copenhagen

Albania
 Oldest Albanian derby: KF Tirana vs. Vllaznia Shkoder
 Tirana derbies:
 Tirana derby I: Partizani Tirana vs. KF Tirana 
 Tirana derby II: Partizani Tirana vs. Dinamo Tirana
 Tirana Derby III: KF Tirana vs. Dinamo Tirana
 Myzeqe Derby: Apolonia Fier vs. KF Lushnja
 Korçë -Tirana rivalries: FK Partizani Tirana or KF Tirana or KS Dinamo Tirana vs. KF Skënderbeu Korçë
 Vlorë -Korça rivalry : KS Flamurtari Vlorë vs. KF Skënderbeu Korçë
 Elbasani -Tirana rivalry : KF Elbasani vs. KF Tirana or Dinamo Tirana or Partizani Tirana
Tirana -Durrës rivalry : Partizani Tirana or KF Tirana or Dinamo Tirana vs. KF Teuta
 North Albanian derby: Vllaznia vs. KF Laçi or KF Kukësi or Besëlidhja Lezhë
 North-East Albanian derby : KF Kukësi vs. Korabi Peshkopi or KF Tërbuni 
 Fieri derby : Apolonia Fier vs. KF Çlirimi
 Coastal derby : KS Flamurtari Vlorë vs. KF Teuta

Andorra
 El Clàssic: FC Santa Coloma vs. UE Sant Julià
 Santa Coloma Derby: FC Santa Coloma vs. UE Santa Coloma

Armenia
 Yerevan derby: Ararat Yerevan vs. Pyunik vs. Urartu

Austria
 Vienna derby: Rapid Wien vs. Austria Wien
 Graz Derby: Grazer AK vs. Sturm Graz
 Upper Austrian Derby : LASK Linz vs. SV Ried 
 Linz Derby: FC Blau-Weiß Linz vs. LASK Linz
 Western derby: Wacker Innsbruck vs. Austria Salzburg
 Derby of Love: First Vienna F.C. vs. Wiener Sportklub
 Lustenau Derby: Austria Lustenau vs. FC Lustenau 07
 Vorarlberg Derbys: Austria Lustenau or FC Lustenau 07 vs. FC Dornbirn 1913 vs. Schwarz Weiß Bregenz vs. SCR Altach
 Niederösterreich Derby: SKN St. Pölten vs. Admira Wacker vs. Horn
 Pack-Derby: Wolfsberger AC vs SK Sturm Graz
 Carinthian derby : Wolfsberger AC vs. SV Austria Klagenfurt
 Western Mostviertel derby: UFC Sankt Peter in der Au vs. USC Seitenstetten

Azerbaijan
 Böyük Oyun: Neftçi vs. Xəzər Lənkəran
 Big Azerbaijani rivalries: Neftçi vs. Qarabağ Ağdam
 Tarixi Derbi (Historical derby): Neftçi vs. Kəpəz

Belarus

The Capital derby:
Dinamo Minsk vs. FC Minsk
Minsk derbies: 
Dinamo Minsk vs. Partizan Minsk
Dinamo Minsk vs Torpedo Minsk
 Belarusian classico: Dinamo Minsk vs. BATE Borisov
 Brest derby: Dinamo Brest vs. Rukh
 Dinamo derby: Dinamo Brest vs. Dinamo Minsk

Belgium

Bosnia and Herzegovina
 Sarajevo derby: FK Sarajevo vs. Željezničar Sarajevo
 Small derby of Sarajevo: FK Sarajevo or Željezničar Sarajevo vs. Olimpik Sarajevo vs. Slavija Sarajevo
 Mostar derby: Zrinjski Mostar vs. Velež Mostar
Herzegovina derby: Zrinjski Mostar vs. NK Široki Brijeg 
Tuzla derby: Sloboda Tuzla vs. Tuzla City
North Tuzla Canton derby : Zvijezda Gradačac vs. Gradina Srebrenik 
Travnik derby: NK Travnik vs. NK Novi Travnik
Kakanj derby: Mladost Doboj Kakanj vs. Rudar Kakanj
Derby of Central Bosnia Canton: NK Novi Travnik vs. NK Busovača
Krajina derby: 
Rudar Prijedor vs. Borac Banja Luka
Krajina Cazin vs. Krajišnik Velika Kladuša
 Susjedski derby: NK Široki Brijeg vs. HŠK Posušje
Inter-city rivalry: FK Sarajevo vs. Borac Banja Luka or Željezničar Sarajevo vs. Borac Banja Luka

Bulgaria
Sofia derbies:
 The Eternal Derby: Levski Sofia vs. CSKA Sofia
 Little capital derby: Slavia Sofia vs. Lokomotiv Sofia
 Oldest capital derby: Levski Sofia vs. Slavia Sofia
 Sofia Derby: Levski Sofia, Lokomotiv Sofia, CSKA Sofia and Slavia Sofia
Plovdiv derbies:
 The Plovdiv derby: Botev Plovdiv vs. Lokomotiv Plovdiv
 Spartak-Maritsa rivalry: Spartak Plovdiv vs. Maritsa Plovdiv
 The New Bulgarian derbies: CSKA Sofia and Levski Sofia vs. Ludogorets Razgrad
 Thracian derby: Botev Plovdiv vs. Beroe Stara Zagora
 Varna derby: Spartak Varna vs. Cherno More Varna 
 Burgas derby: Chernomorets Burgas vs. Neftochimic Burgas
 North derby: Etar Veliko Tarnovo vs. Lokomotiv Gorna Oryahovitsa
 North-West Derby: PFC Montana vs. Botev Vratza
 Railroaders derby: Lokomotiv Plovdiv vs. Lokomotiv Sofia
 Kyustendil Province derby: Velbazhd Kyustendil vs. Marek Dupnitsa
 Southwest derby: Pirin Blagoevgrad vs. Vihren Sandanski vs. Belasitsa Petrich
 Northeast derby: PFC Shumen vs. Dobrudzha Dobrich
 Plovdiv vs. Sofia Rivalry: Botev Plovdiv or Lokomotiv Plovdiv and the Sofia Teams. Especially Botev Plovdiv vs. Levski Sofia and Lokomotiv Plovdiv vs. CSKA Sofia
 Pernik vs. Sofia Rivalry: Minyor Pernik vs. Levski Sofia, CSKA Sofia, Slavia Sofia and Lokomotiv Sofia
 Lovech vs. Sofia Rivalry: Litex Lovech vs. Levski Sofia, Lokomotiv Sofia, CSKA Sofia and Slavia Sofia

Croatia
 Eternal derby: Hajduk Split vs. Dinamo Zagreb
 Adriatic derby: Hajduk Split vs. Rijeka
 Dalmatian derby: Šibenik vs. Hajduk Split
 Dinamo–Rijeka derby: Dinamo Zagreb vs. Rijeka
 Osijek-Rijeka derby : Osijek vs. Rijeka 
 Slavonian derby: Osijek vs. Cibalia
 Zagreb derby: Dinamo Zagreb vs. Lokomotiva vs. Zagreb
 Split Derby: Split vs. Hajduk Split
 Derby della Učka : Rijeka vs. Istra 1961
 Rijeka derby : Rijeka vs. Orijent 1919

Cyprus
 Nicosia derby: APOEL vs. Omonia
 The Oldest Cypriot Derby: APOEL vs. Anorthosis
 Limassol derby: Apollon vs. AEL vs. Aris
 Famagusta derby: Anorthosis vs. Nea Salamina

Czech Republic
Prague derbies:
 Prague derby: Sparta Prague vs. Slavia Prague
 Little Prague derby: Sparta Prague or Slavia Prague or Bohemians 1905 vs. FK Dukla Prague vs. Viktoria Žižkov
 Vršovice derby: Slavia Prague vs. Bohemians 1905
Inter-regional derbies:
 Sparta Prague vs. Baník Ostrava
 Slavia Prague vs. Viktoria Plzeň 
East Bohemian derby: FC Hradec Králové vs. FK Pardubice
North Bohrmian derbies: 
Podještědské derby: FK Jablonec vs. Slovan Liberec
 FK Teplice vs. Baník Most
Moravian derby: FC Zbrojovka Brno vs. Sigma Olomouc vs. 1. FC Slovácko vs. Fastav Zlín vs. FC Vysočina Jihlava
 Silesian derby: 
SFC Opava vs. FC Baník Ostrava 
 Any match between teams Karviná, Frýdek-Místek FC Baník Ostrava, SFC Opava and FC Hlučín

Denmark
Copenhagen region derbies:
 The Copenhagen Derby: Brøndby IF vs. F.C. Copenhagen
 North-west Copenhagen derby: Brønshøj Boldklub vs. Vanløse IF
 Northern Copenhagen derby: Lyngby BK vs. Akademisk Boldklub
 Battle of the Marshland : Akademisk Boldklub vs. Brønshøj Boldklub
 Battle of Northern Zealand : FC Nordsjælland vs. Lyngby BK 
 Historic Rivals: Brøndby IF vs. Aarhus GF
 Jutland derbies:
 Battle of Jutland: Aalborg BK vs. Aarhus GF
 Battle of East Jutland : Randers FC vs. Aarhus GF
 Battle of Southern Jutland : Esbjerg fB vs. SønderjyskE
 Battle of Northern Jutland : Hobro IK vs. Aalborg BK vs. Vendsyssel FF
 Battle of South-Eastern Jutland : AC Horsens vs. Vejle BK
 Battle of Central Jutland : Viborg FF vs. FC Midtjylland vs. Silkeborg IF
 Battle of Hatred: Viborg FF vs. FC Midtjylland
 Herning vs Ikast derby : Herning Fremad vs. Ikast FS
 Aarhus derby : Aarhus Fremad vs. Aarhus GF
 Battle of Funen : Odense BK vs. B1909

England

Estonia
 Tallinn derby: Flora Tallinn vs. Levadia Tallinn vs. Nõmme Kalju

Faroe Islands
 Tórshavn derby: B36 Tórshavn vs. HB Tórshavn
Tórshavn-Klaksvík rivalry: B36 Tórshavn vs KÍ Klaksvík

Finland

Inter-city rivalries
Klassikko Helsinki - Countryside rivalry: HJK vs. Valkeakosken Haka
Moderni klassikko 'The Modern Classic' rivalry between: HJK and FC Lahti
Pirkanmaan derby: Valkeakosken Haka vs. Ilves or Tampere United
Pohjanmaan derby: SJK vs. VPS vs. FF Jaro vs. KPV
Rauma -Pori rivalry: FC Rauma or Pallo-Iirot vs. FC Jazz
Tampere -Helsinki rivalry: Ilves or Tampere United vs. HJK Helsinki or HIFK Helsinki
Turku -Helsinki rivalry: Turun Palloseura or Inter Turku vs. HJK Helsinki or HIFK Helsinki
Turku -Tampere rivalry: Ilves or Tampere United vs. Turun Palloseura or Inter Turku
Seinäjoki -Vaasa rivalry: SJK vs. VPS
Lapin derby / Jänkäderby: RoPS vs. PS Kemi
Raseborgs derby: Ekenäs IF vs. BK-46

City derbies
 Kokkolan derby: KPV vs. GBK
 Pääkaupunkiseudun derby / Metroderby: HJK Helsinki or HIFK Helsinki vs. FC Honka
Rauma derby: FC Rauma vs. Pallo-Iirot
Stadin derby: HJK Helsinki vs. HIFK Helsinki
Tampereen derby: Ilves vs. Tampereen Pallo-Veikot vs. Tampere United
 Turun derby: Turun Palloseura vs. Inter Turku
 Oulun derby: AC Oulu vs. OPS

France

Georgia
 Georgian derby: Dinamo Tbilisi vs. Torpedo Kutaisi
 Tbilisi derby: Dinamo Tbilisi vs. Lokomotivi Tbilisi

Germany

Gibraltar
Europa FC vs. Lincoln Red Imps
Ocean Village derby: Boca Gibraltar vs Bruno's Magpies

Greece

Hungary
 Budapest city derbies: 
 A Derbi: Ferencváros TC vs. Újpest FC
Örökrangadó: Ferencvárosi TC vs. MTK Budapest FC
Any match between Ferencváros TC, Újpest FC, MTK Budapest FC, Vasas SC and Budapest Honvéd FC 
 Győr derby: Gyirmót FC Győr vs. Győri ETO FC
 East derby: Diósgyőri VTK vs. Nyíregyháza Spartacus FC
 Transdanubia derby: Videoton FC vs. Győri ETO FC
 West derby: Szombathelyi Haladás vs. Zalaegerszegi TE
 Budapest-Debrecen derby: Ferencváros TC, Újpest FC, Budapest Honvéd FC  vs. Debreceni VSC
 West-East derby: Videoton FC vs. Debreceni VSC
Baranya derby: Pécsi MFC vs. Komlói Bányász SK

Iceland
 Stjarnan vs. Breiðablik
 Reykjavik Derby: KR vs. Valur Reykjavik vs. Fram Reykjavik vs. Vikingur Reykjavik vs. Fjolnir Reykjavik
 Hafnarfjörður derby: FH vs. Haukar
 Kópavogur derby: Breiðablik vs. HK
 Akureyri derby: KA vs. Þór Akureyri

Ireland

Israel

Italy

Kazakhstan
River derby: Irtysh Pavlodar vs. Akzhayik Uralsk
Two capitals derby: Kairat Almaty vs. Astana
Astana derby: Astana 1964 vs. Astana

Kosovo
Kosovo derby: KF Drita vs. SC Gjilani
Gjilan-Prishtina derbies:
KF Drita vs. KF Prishtina
SC Gjilani vs. KF Prishtina
Drenica Valley derby: KF Feronikeli vs. KF Drenica
Mitrovica derby: Trepça vs. Trepça'89
Peć derby: KF Besa Pejë vs. KF Shqiponja
Prishtina derby: Flamurtari vs. Prishtina

Latvia
Kurzeme derby: FK Ventspils vs. FK Liepāja/MOGO
Riga derby: Riga FC vs. RFS

Lithuania
The new derby of Lithuania : FK Sūduva vs. FK Žalgiris
Vilnius derby : FK Žalgiris vs. FK Trakai vs. FK Vėtra vs. KS Polonia Vilnius vs. FC Vytis Vilnius vs. FC Vilnius
The Old derby : FK Žalgiris vs. FK Ekranas vs. FK Vėtra vs. FBK Kaunas 
Panevėžys derby : FK Panevėžys vs. FK Ekranas
Klaipėda derby : FK Atlantas vs. FK Klaipėdos Granitas vs. FK Palanga vs. FK Neptūnas
Žalgiris' derby : FK Žalgiris vs. FK Kauno Žalgiris
Kaunas derby : FK Kauno Žalgiris vs.  FC Hegelmann Litauen

Luxembourg
 Derby d'Esch : Fola Esch vs. Jeunesse Esch

Malta
 Old Firm Derby: Floriana vs. Sliema Wanderers
 Derby Of The Capital: Valletta vs. Floriana
 Birkirkara vs. Valletta
Derby of the North: Mosta vs. Naxxar Lions
Sliema Wanderers vs. Gżira United
Hibernians vs. Tarxien Rainbows vs. St.lucia
Balzan vs. Lija Athletic
The Old Derby: Ħamrun Spartans vs. Marsa
Cottonera Rivalries: Senglea Athletic vs. Vittoriosa Stars vs. St. George's FC
Għaxaq FC vs. Gudja United
Pembroke Athleta vs. St. Andrews FC vs. Melita vs. Swieqi United
Attard vs. Balzan
Birkirkara vs. Balzan
Żabbar St. Patrick vs. Żejtun Corinthians
Żabbar St. Patrick vs. Xgħajra Tornadoes
Sirens vs. Mellieħa S.C.
Mtarfa vs. Mdina Knights vs. Rabat Ajax vs. Dingli Swallows
Siggiewi FC vs. Żebbuġ Rangers
San Gwann vs. Swieqi United
Msida St.Joseph vs. Ta' Xbiex
Għargħur vs. Naxxar Lions
Qormi FC vs. Żebbuġ Rangers
Kalkara vs. Xgħajra Tornadoes
Kalkara vs. St. George's F.C.
Gudja United vs. St.lucia
St. George's FC vs. Fgura United

Moldova
 El Clasico de Moldova / Derbiul Moldovei : Zimbru Chișinău vs. Sheriff Tiraspol
 Derby-ul capitalei: Zimbru Chișinău vs. Dacia Chișinău
 Chișinău - Orhei derby: Zimbru Chișinău or Dacia Chișinău vs. Milsami Orhei

Montenegro
 Montenegrin derby: Sutjeska Nikšić vs. Budućnost Podgorica
 Nikšić derby: Sutjeska Nikšić vs. Čelik Nikšić
 Podgorica derby: Budućnost Podgorica vs. OFK Titograd Podgorica
 Coastal derby: OFK Petrovac vs. FK Mogren vs. OFK Grbalj vs FK Bokelj

Netherlands

Norway
 Battle of Oslo: Vålerenga Fotball vs. Lyn Fotball
The Classic: Rosenborg BK vs SK Brann
Lillestrøm–Vålerenga rivalry: Lillestrøm SK vs. Vålerenga Fotball
Molde-Rosenborg rivalry: Molde FK vs. Rosenborg BK
Kristiansund BK vs. Molde FK
Sarpsborg FK vs. Fredrikstad FK
Moss FK vs. Fredrikstad FK
Ælv Classico: Strømsgodset IF vs. Mjøndalen IF
SK Brann vs. Vålerenga Fotball
North Norway derby: FK Bodø/Glimt vs. Tromsø IL
Aalesunds FK vs. Molde FK
IL Stålkameratene vs Mo IL
Viking FK vs. FK Haugesund
Best i vest derby: SK Brann vs. Viking FK
IK Start vs. Viking FK
Aust-Agder derby: FK Arendal vs. FK Jerv
Romeriksderbyet: Lillestrøm SK vs. Strømmen IF
Skeid Fotball vs. Vålerenga Fotball
Gjøvik derby: FK Gjøvik-Lyn vs. Vind IL
Nordøy derby: Harøy IL vs. HaNo FK

North Macedonia
 Eternal derby: Vardar Skopje vs. Pelister Bitola
 Albanian derby of North Macedonia:
Shkendija Tetovo vs. Shkupi
 Skopje derbies:
 Old Skopje derby: Vardar Skopje vs. Rabotnicki
 Ethnic derby: Vardar Skopje vs. Shkupi formerly against now defunct predecessor Sloga Jugomagnat
 Dračevo derby: SSK Mladinec vs. FK Dračevo
 Lisiče derby: FK Gorno Lisiče vs. Pobeda Dolno Lisiče
 Karpoš derby: FK Alumina vs. Lokomotiva Karpoš
 Tetovo derby: Teteks vs. Shkendija
 Vardar-Shkendija rivalry: Shkendija Tetovo vs. Vardar Skopje
 Pelagonia derby: Pelister Bitola vs. Pobeda Prilep
 Tikveš derby: Tikves Kavadarci vs. Vardar Negotino
 Lake derby: FK Ohrid vs. Karaorman Struga
 Rice derby: Osogovo Kochani vs. Sloga Vinica
 Kichevo derby: Napredok vs. Vlazrimi
 Prilep derby: Pobeda vs. 11 Oktomvri
 East derby: Bregalnica Štip vs. Belasica Strumica
 Brotherhood derby: Teteks Tetovo vs. Vardar Skopje
 Pijanec derby: Bregalnica Delčevo vs. Sasa Makedonska Kamenica
 Maleshevo derby: Maleš Berovo vs. Napredok Pehčevo
 Cheshinovo-Obleshevo derby: FK Cheshinovo vs. FK Obleshevo
Miners derby: Rudar Probistip vs. Sasa Makedonska Kamenica

Northern Ireland

Poland

Portugal

Rivalries between the Big Three
Derby de Lisboa: S.L. Benfica vs. Sporting CP
O Clássico: S.L. Benfica vs. FC Porto
FC Porto–Sporting CP rivalry
Madeira derby: CS Marítimo vs. CF União vs. CD Nacional
 Minho derby: Vitória de Guimarães vs. SC Braga
 Porto derby: Boavista vs. FC Porto, sometimes called O Dérbi da Invicta
The Small Lisbon derby: Belenenses vs. Atlético
 Algarve derby: Farense vs. Olhanense vs. Portimonense
Leiria - Coimbra rivalry: União de Leiria vs. Académica

Romania
Bucharest derbies:
 Eternal derby: Steaua Bucharest vs. Dinamo Bucharest
 Big Bucharest derby:
 Steaua – Rapid derby: Steaua Bucharest vs. Rapid Bucharest
 Dinamo Bucharest vs. Rapid Bucharest
 Small/Traditional Bucharest derby: Sportul Studențesc vs. Progresul Bucharest
 Any match between Progresul București or Sportul Studențesc vs. Rapid București or FCSB or Dinamo București
 Cluj derby: Universitatea Cluj vs. CFR Cluj
 West derby: UTA Arad vs. Politehnica Timișoara
 Former Ploiești derby: Petrolul Ploiești vs. Astra Giurgiu
 Primus derby: Petrolul Ploieşti vs. Rapid București
 Bucharest - Oltenia derby: Dinamo Bucharest vs Universitatea Craiova
 Oltenia derby: CSU Craiova or FCU Craiova vs. Pandurii Târgu Jiu
 Craiova derby: CSU Craiova vs. FCU Craiova
 Hunedoara derby: Corvinul Hunedoara vs. Jiul Petroșani
 Moldova derby: Politehnica Iași vs. Oțelul Galați, FC Vaslui or FC Botoșani
 North-East derby: FC Botoşani vs Foresta Suceava vs Politehnica Iași
 Lower Danube derby: Oțelul Galați vs. Dacia Unirea Brăila or Farul Constanța 
 North derby: Olimpia Satu Mare vs. FCM Baia Mare
Crișana derby: FC Bihor Oradea vs. UTA Arad

Russia

Scotland

Serbia

 Belgrade derbies:
 Eternal derby: Red Star Belgrade vs. Partizan Belgrade
 OFK Belgrade vs. Red Star Belgrade
 OFK Belgrade vs. Partizan Belgrade 
 Rad Belgrade vs. Red Star Belgrade
 OFK Belgrade vs. Rad Belgrade
 Rad Belgrade vs. Partizan Belgrade
 FK Voždovac vs. Rad Belgrade
 FK Zemun vs. OFK Belgrade, Partizan Belgrade or Red Star Belgrade
 Derby of Serbia: Vojvodina Novi Sad vs. Red Star Belgrade or Partizan Belgrade
 Novi Sad derby: Vojvodina Novi Sad vs. FK Novi Sad
 Derbi nizije (Lowland derby) or Derbi ravnice (Plain derby): Vojvodina Novi Sad vs. Spartak Subotica
 Political derby: FK Rad vs. FK Novi Pazar
 Šumadija derby: Radnički Kragujevac vs. FK Smederevo
 South Serbian derby: GFK Dubočica vs. Radnički Niš

Slovakia
 Traditional derby: Slovan Bratislava vs. Spartak Trnava
 Bratislava derby: Slovan Bratislava vs. Inter Bratislava vs. FC Petržalka
 DAC-Slovan derby: Slovan Bratislava vs. DAC Dunajská Streda
 Košice Derby: Lokomotíva Košice vs. VSS Košice
 North-Slovakian derby: MŠK Žilina vs. AS Trenčín
 Over the hill derby: MFK Ružomberok vs. FK Dukla Banská Bystrica
 Eastern Slovak derby: FC Košice vs. Tatran Prešov
 Záhorie-Kopanice derby: FK Senica vs. Spartak Myjava

Slovenia
 Eternal Derby of Slovenia: NK Maribor vs. NK Olimpija Ljubljana
 Slovene Littoral derby: ND Gorica vs. FC Koper
 Prekmurje derby: NK Mura vs. NK Nafta
 Prekmurje–Styria derby: NK Maribor vs. NK Mura
 Styrian derby: NK Maribor vs. NK Celje
Zasavje derby: NK Zagorje vs. Rudar Trbovlje

Spain

Sweden

Switzerland
 Basel - Zürich rivalry: FC Basel vs. Grasshoppers or FC Zürich
 Zürich Derby: Grasshoppers vs. FC Zürich
 Bernese Derby: Young Boys vs. FC Thun
 Luzerner Derby: FC Luzern vs. SC Kriens
 St. Gallen Derby: FC St.Gallen vs. FC Wil
 Lac Leman Derby: Servette FC vs. FC Lausanne-Sports
 Aargau Derby: FC Aarau vs. FC Wohlen
 Zentralschweizer Derby: SC Cham vs. SC Kriens
 Derby Romand : 
FC Sion vs. FC Lausanne-Sports
Neuchâtel Xamax FCS vs. FC Sion
 Neuchâtel - Geneva Derby: Neuchâtel Xamax vs. Servette FC
 Derby del Ticino : FC Chiasso vs. AC Bellinzona vs. FC Lugano
 Bratwurst Derby: FC St.Gallen vs. SC Brühl
 Derby Vaudois : Stade Nyonnais vs. Yverdon Sport
 Derby du Rhône : Servette FC vs. FC Sion

Turkey

Ukraine
 Ukrainian derby (Ukrainian Classic): Dynamo Kyiv vs. Shakhtar Donetsk
 Main Kyiv derby: Arsenal Kyiv vs. Dynamo Kyiv
 Donetsk derby: Shakhtar Donetsk vs. Metalurh Donetsk
 Dnipro – Kharkiv derby (East Ukrainian Classic): Metalist Kharkiv vs. FC Dnipro
 Dnipro – Dynamo rivalry: Dynamo Kyiv vs. FC Dnipro
 Lviv derby: FC Lviv vs. FC Karpaty Lviv
 Zaporizhzhia derby: FC Metalurh Zaporizhzhia vs. FC Torpedo Zaporizhzhia
 Odessa derby: FC Chornomorets Odesa vs. SC Odesa (formerly with SKA Odessa)
 Galicia – Volhynia derby (rivalry): FC Karpaty Lviv vs. FC Volyn Lutsk
 Main Volhynia derby: FC Volyn Lutsk vs. FC Veres Rivne
 Main Podillia derby: FC Nyva Vinnytsia vs. FC Podillya Khmelnytskyi
 Main Donbas rivalry: FC Shakhtar Donetsk vs. FC Zorya Luhansk, also can included Metalurh Donetsk, Stal Alchevsk
 Kropyvnytskyi rivalry: FC Oleksandriya vs. FC Zirka Kropyvnytskyi
 Metalurh derby (former): Metalurh Donetsk vs. FC Metalurh Zaporizhzhia
 Minor Kyiv derby: FC Obolon Kyiv vs. FC CSKA Kyiv
 Dnipro river derby: FC Metalurh Zaporizhzhia vs. FC Dnipro or Dynamo Kyiv

Wales

References

External links
 FootballDerbies.com
 FIFA.com
 EuroRivals.net – fixtures, results and videos of football derbies
 50 Greatest Rivalries in World Football – Bleacher Report

Europe
Rivalries